Shirley Martin  (November 20, 1932 in Hamilton, Ontario – September 16, 2021) was a Canadian politician.

Martin was a businesswoman and was first elected to the House of Commons of Canada in the 1984 federal election as the Progressive Conservative Member of Parliament for Lincoln, Ontario.

In 1987, she became Parliamentary Secretary to the Minister of Public Works. After the 1988 federal election, she joined Prime Minister Brian Mulroney's Cabinet as Minister of State for Transport. She served briefly as Minister of State for Indian Affairs and Northern Development (1990–1991) before returning to the Transport portfolio.

She retired from Cabinet in 1993 when Mulroney was succeeded as PC leader and prime minister by Kim Campbell, and was not a candidate in the 1993 federal election.

External links

1932 births
2021 deaths
Women members of the House of Commons of Canada
Women government ministers of Canada
Members of the 24th Canadian Ministry
Members of the House of Commons of Canada from Ontario
Members of the King's Privy Council for Canada
Politicians from Hamilton, Ontario
Progressive Conservative Party of Canada MPs
Women in Ontario politics
20th-century Canadian women politicians